Yahalom is an authentication and secure key-sharing protocol designed for use on an insecure network such as the Internet. Yahalom uses a trusted arbitrator to distribute a shared key between two people. This protocol can be considered as an improved version of Wide Mouth Frog protocol (with additional protection against man-in-the-middle attack), but less secure than the Needham–Schroeder protocol.

Protocol description 
If Alice (A) initiates the communication to Bob (B) with S is a server trusted by both parties, the protocol can be specified as follows using security protocol notation:
 A and B are identities of Alice and Bob respectively
  is a symmetric key known only to A and S
  is a symmetric key known only to B and S
  is a symmetric, generated key, which will be the session key of the session between A and B

Alice sends a message to Bob requesting communication.

Bob sends a message to the Server encrypted under .

The Server sends to Alice a message containing the generated session key  and a message to be forwarded to Bob.

Alice forwards the message to Bob and verifies  has not changed. Bob will verify  has not changed when he receives the message.

BAN-Yahalom 
Burrows􏰂, Abadi􏰂 and Needham proposed a variant of this protocol in their 1989 paper as follows:

In 1994, Paul Syverson demonstrated two attacks on this protocol.

See also 
 Kerberos protocol
 Otway–Rees protocol
 Neuman–Stubblebine protocol

References

 M. Burrows, M. Abadi, R. Needham A Logic of Authentication, Research Report 39, Digital Equipment Corp. Systems Research Center, Feb. 1989
 M. Burrows, M. Abadi, R. Needham A Logic of Authentication. ACM Transactions on Computer Systems, v. 8, n. 1, Feb. 1990, pp. 18—36

Cryptographic protocols
Computer access control protocols